INCredible is an offshoot of Sony Music Entertainment. INCredible releases electronic dance music of all kinds, including the Gatecrasher series. The label has also released singles from artists such as Satoshi Tomiie and James Holden.

See also
 List of record labels

References

External links

British record labels
Electronic music record labels
English electronic dance music record labels